The Diocese of Vittorio Veneto is a Roman Catholic diocese in northern Italy, with capital in Vittorio Veneto. It was historically known as Diocese of Ceneda, the name being changed in 1939.

Ceneda began as a suffragan of the patriarchate of Aquileia until the latter's suppression in 1751. From 1752 until 1818 Ceneda was a suffragan of the archdiocese of Udine.  Since 1818 Ceneda has been in the ecclesiastical province headed by the Patriarchate of Venice. Art from several churches in the diocese is housed in its diocesan museum.

History

The city of Vittorio Veneto includes the town of Ceneda which in ancient times was a castrum known as Ceneta and  poetically as Acedum.  The city is situated in the province of Treviso, just north of Conegliano.

It was pillaged by Attila the Hun in 452, and a century later by Totila. After 568, during the domination of the Lombards, it was governed by a duke and then a count.  Still later it became part of the marquisate of Treviso.

The Gospel is said to have been preached in the region in the first century by St. Fortunatus, deacon of bishop St. Hermagoras of Aquileia. Attesting to the presence of Christianity is one of the earliest pieve of the diocese, Sant'Andrea di Bigonzo, which dates from the fourth century.

However, the historical beginning of episcopal see of Ceneda is uncertain.  There may have been a bishop present in Ceneda very soon after the Lombard conquest.  The first reputed bishop seems to have been Vindemius who was present in 579 at the Synod of Grado which continued the Schism of the Three Chapters. In 680, it seems that a bishop Ursinus was present at the Council of Rome convened against the Monothelites. However, the diocese does not seem to have been officially organized until 685 when the Lombard duke Grumoaldo assigned to the bishop of Ceneda a large part of the territory that had formerly been under the care of Oderzo to counter the claims of Oderzo's bishop in exile.  Oderzo had, in fact, been destroyed by the Lombards in 667 and its Oderzo sought refuge with the Byzantines in the Venetian lagoon. 
Significantly, the patron saint of the diocese is actually a bishop of Oderzo, Titianus, whose body is said to have miraculously been carried up the Livenza River against the current and to have come to rest at the site of the present cathedral after being carried in a cart by a donkey.

From 994 the bishop of that city became also its temporal lord, even after it was politically incorporated into the Republic of Venice in 1389.  In 1447 and in 1514 bishops Francesco and Oliviero gave the republic civil investiture of the territory of Ceneda, reserving for themselves and their successors (until about 1768) authority over the city and a few villas.

Among its bishops have been: Azzo (1140); Sigifredo (1170), during whose time there were many conflicts between Ceneda and the neighbouring towns; Antonion Correr (1409); Lorenzo da Ponte (1739), the last bishop to exercise temporal power, and Albino Luciani (1958–1969) who became pope John Paul I in 1978.

Shrines
Within the confines of the diocese is the Basilica of Motta di Livenza, built near the spot where Giovanni Cigana reported the Blessed Virgin Mary appeared to him on March 9, 1510 during his praying of the rosary. She asked him and the inhabitants of the area to fast as an act of repentance for sin for at least three consecutive Saturdays, pray to God for mercy, and to build a basilica on the site so that people could come for prayer. The Marian apparition was subsequently investigated and proclaimed worthy of belief by pope Julius II.

Diocesan patrons
San Tiziano -  feast day January 16.
Sant'Augusta di Serravalle - feast day August 27; March 27 in the Roman Martyrology

Bishops

Diocese of Ceneda
Erected: 6th century
Latin Name: Cenetensis
Metropolitan: Patriarchate of Venice
Some series begin with:
Vindemius (579–591?)
Ursinus (680–?)
Satinus (731–?)
Valentinianus (712–740)
Maximus (741–790)
Dulcissimus (c.793–?)
Ermonius (c.827–?)
Ripaldus (885–908)
Coterminously Bishops of Ceneda and Counts of Ceneda:

from 950 to 1300

Sicardo (962–997), given title of count by Holy Roman Emperor
Grauso (c. 998 – 1002?)
Bruno 
Helminger (Elmengero) (1021–1031)
Almanguino (1053–?)
Giovanni (1074–?)
Roperto (1124–?)
Sigismondo (1130–?)
Azzone Degli Azzoni (1140–1152)
Aimone (1152–?)
Sigisfredo da Conegliano (1170–1184)
Matteo Da Siena (1187–1217)
Gherardo da Camino (1217)
Alberto Da Camino (1220–1242)
Warnerio da Polcenigo (Guarnieri Da Polcenigo) (1242–1251)
Rugerino di Aquileia (1251–1257)
Biaquino Da Camino (1257)
Alberto Da Collo (1257–1261)
Odorico (1261)
Presavio Novello (Prosapio Novello) (1262–1279)
Marzio da Fiabiane (Marco Da Fabiane) (1279–1285)
Pietro Calza (1286–1300)

from 1300 to 1600
 
Francesco Arpo (1300–1310), first count of Tarzo
Manfredo di Collalto (1310–1320) 
Francesco Ramponi (1320–1348) 
Gasberto de Orgoglio (Gualberto De'Orgoglio) (1349–1374)
Oliviero da Verona (1374–1377)
Francesco Calderini (1378–1381?)
Giorgio Torti (1381–1383)
Marco Porri (Marco De'Porris) (1383–1394), after 1389 bishops retain title of count but with duties of civil magistrates of the Venetian Republic
Martino de' Franceschinis (Martino Franceschini) (1394–1399))
Pietro Marcelli (1399–1409)
Antonio Correr (bishop) (1409–1445)
Pietro Leon (1445–1474)
Nicolò Trevisan (1474–1498)
Francesco Brevio (1498–1508)
Marino Grimani (1508–1517)
Domenico Grimani (1517–1520)
Giovanni Grimani (1520–1531)
Marino Grimani (1532–1540)
Giovanni Grimani (1540–1545), second time
Marino Grimani (1545–1546)
Michele della Torre (1547–1586), named cardinal 1583
Marco Antonio Mocenigo (1586–1597), erected diocesan seminary

from 1600 to 1786

Leonardo Mocenigo (1599–1623)
Piero Valier (1623–1625), translated to Padua
Marco Giustiniani (1625–1631)
Marcantonio Bragadin(1631–1639), translated to Vicenza
Sebastiano Pisani (seniore) (1639–1653)
Albertino Barisoni (1653–1667)
Pietro Leoni (bishop) (1667–1691)
Marcantonio Agazzi (1692–1710)
Francesco Trevisan (1710–1725)
Benedetto De Luca (1725–1739)
Lorenzo Da Ponte (bishop) (1740–1768), born Venice, last count-bishop. He was the namesake of the librettist of the same name, whom he baptised.
Giannagostino Gradenigo (1768–1774 Died)
Giampaolo Dolfin (1774–1777 Appointed, Bishop of Bergamo)
Marco Zaguri (1777–1785) (Appointed Bishop of Vicenza)
Pietro Antonio Zorzi, CRS (1786–1792)

from 1786 to 1939

Giambenedetto Falier (1792–1821 Died)
Giacomo Monico (1823–1827)
Bernardo Antonino Squarcina, OP (1828–1842)
Manfredo Giovanni Battista Bellati (1843–1869 Died)
Corradino Cavriani (1871–1885)
Sigismondo Brandolini Rota (1885–1908)
Andrea Caron (1908–1912)
Rodolfo Caroli (1913–1917)
Eugenio Beccegato (1917–1943)

Diocese of Vittorio Veneto
Name Changed: 13 May 1939
Latin Name: Victoriensis Venetorum
Metropolitan: Patriarchate of Venice
Giuseppe Zaffonato (1945–1956)
Giuseppe Carraro (1956–1958)
Albino Luciani (1958–1969), translated to Venice (1969); elected Pope (1978)
Antonio Cunial (1970–1982)
Eugenio Ravignani (1983–1997)
Alfredo Magarotto (1997–2003)
Giuseppe Zenti (2003–2007)
Corrado Pizziolo (2007–present)

References

Books and articles

External links

Benigni, Umberto. "Ceneda." The Catholic Encyclopedia. Vol. 3. New York: Robert Appleton Company, 1908. p. 519.   Retrieved:2016-09-30.

Roman Catholic dioceses in Veneto
Dioceses established in the 6th century